LSR Group is a Russian real estate development, construction and building materials company. LSR Group is one of the leaders in the real estate and building materials in Russia. The company headquarter is located in St. Petersburg. In 2019, the total number of employees is about 11,000 people. As of 2008, the company embraced 24 subsidiaries.

History
The company was founded in 1993 by a Russian entrepreneur Andrey Molchanov. The company's name derives from LenStroyRekonstruktsiya.

LSR Group is an open joint stock company, and is a 100% owner of its major subsidiaries and companies.

In November 2007 the company offered 12.5% of its share capital for trading at the London Stock Exchange and MICEX through IPO having raised US$772 million. After the offering, the company's market capitalization amounted to $6.8 billion.

In April 2010 the company offered 10% of its share capital for trading at the London Stock Exchange and MICEX through SPO having raised US$398.1 million (including expenses for the offering).

In 2021, the company left the London Stock Exchange because of its low market liquidity.

References

External links
 LSR Group website

Construction and civil engineering companies of Russia
Companies listed on the Moscow Exchange
Companies based in Saint Petersburg
Real estate companies of Russia
Construction and civil engineering companies established in 1993
Russian companies established in 1993
Real estate companies established in 1993